Mattia Persano (born 21 September 1996) is an Italian football player. He plays for Arezzo.

Club career
He made his Serie C debut for Lecce on 14 September 2016 in a game against Catanzaro.

On 31 January 2020, he returned to Italy and signed with Rieti.

On 13 August 2020 he joined Turris.

On 17 December 2021, his contract with Vibonese was terminated by mutual consent. On 20 December 2021, he returned to Arezzo.

References

External links
 

1996 births
Sportspeople from the Province of Lecce
Footballers from Apulia
Living people
Italian footballers
Association football forwards
U.S. Lecce players
Modena F.C. players
S.S. Arezzo players
F.C. Rieti players
S.S. Turris Calcio players
FC Hermannstadt players
U.S. Vibonese Calcio players
Serie C players
Liga I players
Italian expatriate footballers
Italian expatriate sportspeople in Romania
Expatriate footballers in Romania
21st-century Italian people